Municipal elections were held in the Dominican Republic on February 16, 2020, to elect all local governments officials in the country, including mayors, deputy mayors, aldermen, directors, deputy directors, and voices in municipalities. However, due to countless electoral polling places reporting problems with the electronic voting system within the first few hours of opening the polls, the Central Electoral Board (Spanish: Junta Central Electoral, JCE) decided to suspend the elections. The elections were rescheduled to March 15, 2020.

These would have been the second municipal elections to be held solely and apart from any other electoral process in the country's history and the first since 1968. It is the first time in the country's voting history that elections have been suspended.

After the suspension of the elections, various acts of violence in the province of Santo Domingo took place that left at least two dead and several injured; additionally another person died before the suspension of the election, that is, during the voting.

In the hours following the suspension and for several days after February 16, thousands of Dominicans took to the streets to demand the resignation of the Central Electoral Board.

Initially concentrated at The Flag Square, a monument dedicated to the Dominican flag which is located across the street from the main site of the Central Electoral Board in Santo Domingo de Guzmán, the protests have since extended to other locations across the country, and in cities around the world, led by the Dominican diaspora.

Electoral system
Municipalities in the Dominican Republic are governed by ayuntamientos, which are the basic political institutions in the country. Ayuntamientos have independent legal personality and have two governing bodies, the municipal council, composed of the mayor and a plenary assembly of councillors (the local legislative branch), and the Office of the Mayor, known as Alcaldía, directed by the mayor (the local executive branch). Municipalities are often divided into Municipal Districts, governed by decentralized organs under the municipality known as district councils (Juntas Distritales) composed of a District director (Director distrital) and an assembly of district councillors (vocales).

The city of Santo Domingo de Guzman is contained within the Distrito Nacional, the site of national government, and possesses a special status, as is common in federal nations. However, in practice and for the purposes of local administration, the rules that apply for the country's municipalities also apply for the capital.

Regidores are allocated to municipal councils based on the following scale:

District councillors (vocales) are elected at the rate of 3 in Municipal Districts with a population of up to 15,000, and 5, in districts with a population greater than 15,000.

Election method
The mayor is directly elected by popular vote. For the first time the choice of councilors will feature preferential voting, meaning that when citizens vote for a specific councilor candidate, this vote would be automatically counted towards that candidate's party and also towards the candidate for mayor of that same party. This system differs from previous elections, in which a closed list was used. The allocation of the total number of councilors to be chosen for each party/alliance will be determined by total votes received. This means all votes cast for mayor, for each of the councilors, and for each party/alliance will be added using open list proportional representation and the D'Hondt method. Candidates will be selected based on the position won according to the preference vote. Municipal District officials will be elected the same way.

Election system
After claims of irregularities with the automated voting system during the Simultaneous Primary in October 2019, the Central Electoral Board decided that this system would only be used in those municipalities whose number of councilors to elect would be eleven or more in addition to the municipality of Mao.

In total, the automated voting system was to be used in 18 municipalities across the country, while the remaining 140 municipalities would use the traditional manual voting system. The Municipal Districts will use the same method as the municipality to which they belong.

For the rescheduled date, the Central Electoral Board eliminated the automated voting option.

Suspension of elections and national protests
In the early hours of February 16, Dominican citizens began approaching their designated sites to vote. Although polling places were scheduled to open nationwide at 7 am, delays began to be reported which led the president of the Central Election Board, Julio César Castaños Guzmán, to ask that citizens “have patience” as he indicated during a press conference at the board's headquarters that some “polling places may experience delays” in starting the electoral process.

At 11:11 am, Castaños Guzmán called for a second press conference to announce that elections would be suspended nationwide due to the widespread failure of the electronic voting system. He said that elections could not continue because the electoral ballot did not load properly in a majority of polling places in which the automated voting system was being used.

Issues with the automated voting system became known to the Central Electoral Board on the evening prior to the elections as the board's technical team was installing the voting machines. The issues were communicated to the Organization of American States, who was participating in the elections as part of a group of international observers, and to delegates from all political parties. The Central Electoral Board's technical team attempted to correct the issues by visiting the affected polling sites after 5PM on February 15 but were unable to correct them. José Ignacio Paliza, opposition leader and president of the Modern Revolutionary Party, was among first to report the technical issues were present as early as the night before the elections in heavily populated provinces and municipalities across the country, such as Puerto Plata, San Pedro, San Francisco de Macorís, San Cristóbal, and Santo Domingo Oeste. Paliza reported that the issues had not been resolved as of 6:10 am on the morning of the elections. Shortly after opening the polls, delegates from several parties began reporting problems at specific polling sites, indicating that the voting equipment failed to load the ballots fully. This meant certain candidate names, primarily of candidates from opposition parties, would not appear at all, making it impossible for their supporters to vote for them.

The automated voting system was to be used in 18 municipalities across the country, representing 62% of all registered voters, as these municipalities have the largest populations, while the remaining 140 municipalities would use the traditional manual voting system for 38% of registered voters.

Protests

Dominican Republic 
Shortly after the Central Electoral Board's announcement, groups of Dominican citizens, outraged with the electoral suspension itself and the lack of information regarding the causes behind the technical failure, took to the streets to protest against the Central Electoral Board. The peaceful protests began in Santo Domingo de Guzman and were initially concentrated at [The Flag Square], a monument dedicated to the Dominican flag which is located across from the main site of the Central Electoral Board. The protests have since extended to other locations across the country, and in cities around the world, led by the Dominican diaspora.

Some of the main issues raised by the protesters were the perceived collaboration between the electoral board and the current government, the use of national funds for the benefit of politicians and their families, and a generalized frustration with political corruption and impunity. Other issues addressed were the poor state of the country's public health and education systems, the privatization of protected areas, crime, and the weakened state of Dominican democracy. A majority of the protesters are young, educated, and represent various social classes. Many have taken to wearing black clothes and covering their faces with masks to protect their identity to avoid retaliation from the government.

Also at issue was the lack of information provided by the Central Electoral Board about the failures and a concern that the incident would not be investigated fully. This dissatisfaction led many protesters to call for the resignation of the current Central Electoral Board.

After the suspension, the Central Electoral Board began taking measures to contain the protests by increasing security around the building's perimeter as early as the morning following the suspended elections, when the first manifestation was expected to take place.

Repression of protesters intensified on Tuesday, as crowds grew larger at The Flag Square. Military agents were deployed to the area to support the National Police and on Tuesday evening, tear gas devices were detonated against the crowd. The move was criticized by the local and international press, the Central Electoral Board, opposition parties, and the government.

Although the country's security forces were quick to distance themselves from the incident, the Minister of Defense, Lieutenant General Ruben Paulio Sem, later confirmed that the tear gas devices were launched by a rogue military agent and were not authorized, as the protest had been organized and peaceful, there was no threatening activity, and the situation did not call for such a response. According to reports, protesters “took the time to pick up litter and clean up the plaza”, putting the trash “into organized trash bags” and have “urged each other to show respect to authorities, particularly local police”.

On February 24, the Dominican Government increased Dominican National Police and Dominican Army presence in the areas surrounding President Danilo Medina's residence in the Los Cacicazgos neighborhood, which is located near the Flag Square, the main site of the protest in Santo Domingo. On February 25, reports surfaced of protest repression, as pedestrians and cyclists carrying placards or wearing black clothes were prohibited from transiting freely on the street. Authorities were reported to have confiscated and destroyed protest signs.

Worldwide

Aftermath and investigation
After the suspension of the elections, the Central Electoral Board asked outside organizations to audit the voting system and an investigation is in process. The Organization of American States, the International Foundation for Electoral Systems and the Inter-American Union of Electoral Organizations (UNIORE) have agreed to perform an investigation into the elections.

On February 19, 2020, National Police spokesman Frank Félix Durán Mejía said that two individuals, police Col. Ramón Antonio Guzmán Peralta, who had been assigned as security detail to the presidential candidate of one of the opposition parties, Luis Abinader, and Manuel Antonio Regalado, a technician for the Claro telecommunications company, were detained for trying to sabotage the elections. Both individuals were interrogated and have since been released. A third individual alleged to be involved in the incident, Coronel Koji Maruyama, has not been questioned by authorities.

Election schedule
Key dates relating primaries and the general election will be as follows:

Primaries

General elections

Nominations
After the process for internal elections during the month of October, on November 8 the electoral campaign was formally opened and the electoral calendar began to run. The parties had to formally register their candidates during the first week of December 2019, each Municipal Electoral Board decided on December 11 on the admission or rejection of all candidacies.

For this election a total of 158 mayors and the same amount of vice mayors will be chosen; 1,164 councillors (regidores) and a similar amount of alternates; 235 directors, same proportion of deputy directors and 735 district councillors (vocales).

Women's quota and Youth quota

After that date, several complaints and legal complaints have been filed against the rejection of candidacies and, above all, changes in the composition of the ballots of the parties in relation to deputies and councilors, especially regarding the changes produced in those with the objective of complying the quota of women and the quota of youth. For this reason, the Central Electoral Board has not yet published the definitive list of candidates. The electoral law establishes a gender quota of no more than 60% and not less than 40%, for any gender, at the congressional and municipal levels, the municipal law previously established that the running mates of mayors and directors should be of the opposite gender.

On December 16, the Superior Electoral Court (TSE) presented a formula and urged that it be the basis as an example of how the woman's quota should be applied fairly, this formula was submitted on the occasion of rejecting the action initiated by Niurka M. Reyes Guzmán (PRM - El Seibo), a former pre-candidate for a deputy, the court understood that her fundamental rights had not been violated because in her demarcation there was only one position submitted to popular election during the primaries. Two days later, the TSE instituted a special and more agile procedure to hear the appeals for amparo and the challenges filed against the decisions of the Electoral Boards, during the first four days (from December 16 to 19) the total files deposited have amounted to 235.

On the other hand, according to the law, 10% of the candidates must be between 18 and 35 years of age, this provision known as the youth quota has not presented the same degree of disagreements or holders in the media, in fact, neither the JCE or the TSE has established any selection method, this is probably because Electoral Laws says its at national level, but the ambiguity of the law based on the levels of election will make the challenges more recurrent in the days to publish the candidates definitive list approaches.

Opinion polls

National

By municipality

Santo Domingo, DN

Santiago de los Caballeros

Results

Overall

City control

The following table lists the mayor changes in provincial capitals, as well as in municipalities of at least 50,000 inhabitants. The inauguration of the new municipal councils will took place on April 24, 2020 unless otherwise noted.

Gains for a party are highlighted in that party's color. For official reasons a party gain is based on the party which won the municipality on the last election instead of the outgoing mayor current affiliation, additionally, the incoming mayor listed party depends on the party that lead the alliance (if existed) in that specific location, this means an alliance may have various parties listed as incoming instead of just the national mayor party of that alliance.
Outgoing mayors marked with an asterisk (*) are not seeking reelection in 2020.

See also 
Timeline of 2020 Dominican Republic Municipal Election Protests

Notes

References

Dominican Republic
Elections in the Dominican Republic
February 2020 events in North America